A bulletin board is a surface intended for the posting of public messages.

Bulletin board may also refer to:

 Bulletin board system, a computer server running software that allows users to connect to the system using a terminal program
List of bulletin board systems
 Bulletin Board (album), an album by The Partridge Family

See also
Bulletin (disambiguation)
Internet forum
BBCode or Bulletin Board Code